Myriam Chalek is a French fashion designer, entrepreneur and diversity and inclusion advocate. She is known for putting on alternative fashion shows meant to challenge the idea of beauty and empower people living with disabilities.

Early life and education
Chalek was born in France and raised in Paris, in the suburbs of Seine-Saint-Denis. After secondary school, she enrolled at Paris V Descartes Law School, where she participated in a student exchange program with the University of Laval. She then returned to France and graduated with a master's degree in international business law from the University of Paris.

Career
After graduating with her Masters of Law, she went on to work with a variety of organizations in which she experienced the hierarchy that is common within the workplace. Having an entrepreneurial spirit, she knew that her next job must be her own.

Chalek traveled to New York as an F1 student and was quickly offered a full-time position by the director of the school as a business professor. Through her work at the business institute and in New York's fashion industry, she met various designers and learned about the product marketing process that designers work through. Designers also have to work with various parties from marketing professionals to lawyers. For young designers just starting out, this all was often a daunting process, and yet there was no single company with both the know-how and network to guide them. Chalek saw the opportunity to fulfill the designers' needs and thus started her first company, Creative Business House. Now designers could have someone who had expertise in everything from marketing their product to protecting their intellectual property to the administrative aspects of the design business.

As her business grew, Chalek found that the various event organizations with which she worked with often did not meet her needs or were beyond her clients budgets, so she created the event company White Tie Affairs to work with Creative Business House clients. Word got out of her success, and the philanthropic organization Association Let's Give a Chance offered her the position of vice president. Chalek accepted the offer and also became one of its main benefactor partners. A year later, as part of this partnership, she launched "a physical annex in New York City under the name Do Not Be Cheap."

In April, 2018, Chalek traveled to Cambodia with non-profit organization "Donnons Leur Une Chance" to distribute tools, sewing machines, and 1000 chickens to families living in poverty.

International Dwarf Fashion Show
One day when Chalek was shopping for clothes she noticed a woman of short stature in the children's section. The women did not have any children with her and appeared to be shopping for herself. The women was obviously frustrated and could not find any clothes that fit and were within her budget.

Chalek later learned that the woman had a disability known as dwarfism, which affects approximately 30,000 people in the United States, is caused by a number of medical conditions, and limits the height of individuals with dwarfism to no more than four feet ten inches. Like any disability, dwarfs are not only at risk for a range of medical problems but are often faced with limitations and discrimination. This limits their employment opportunities and forces many to get by on a meager income. Should they happen to have a limited income, people living with dwarfism struggle to obtain clothes that fit. They can either go to a tailor to have apparel custom-made; shop in the children's department in hopes of find something that fits them physically and emotionally as adults; make their own clothes; or alter oversized clothing. This forces some with dwarfism to spend more money and time in obtaining well-fitted clothes.

Working for years in the fashion industry, Chalek knew that "fashion is about the garment, and not about the person wearing the garment".  Chalek knew that the outfits created by the designers come in all types of shapes and sizes discrimination within the industry also exists as well. When it comes to hiring models to display the outfits, designers have almost solely hired models who are "tall and skinny". Myriam knew this was her chance to challenge the discrimination and idea of beauty and what it means to be beautiful. Utilizing her network within the fashion industry and driven by her need of philanthropy, Chalek created The National Dwarf Fashion Show.

In September 2014 The National Dwarf Fashion Show had its debut performance at the Pavillon Gabriel as part of Paris's annual Fashion week. The event supposed to be a single event meant to put the spotlight on dwarfism, brought attention to the existing discriminations within the fashion industry and empowered women living with dwarfism. The event received press coverage and appealed to the Lifetime network producing the reality show Little Women New York who collaborated with Chalek to get a show as part of New York Fashion Week featuring Jordanna James of Little Women New York.

In 2015, Berlin based fashion designer Sema Gedik learned about Myriam's alternative fashion shows that have been a part of Fashion Week in major cities like Tokyo (Paris and New York). Inspired by the concept, she held a small fashion show as a tribute to her cousin Gedik who was also living with dwarfism.

The first international dwarf fashion show in Paris led the media to give an abundance of coverage to the event and during the 2015 Fashion Week in Paris the National Dwarf Fashion Show was invited to the French Ministry of Culture to support and promote alternative standards of beauty in an industry where the values of tall and thin are the norm.

The International Dwarf Fashion Show has taken part in fashion weeks in major cities including Tokyo and Dubai.

Blind Fashion Show 
After success with the Dwarf Fashion Shows, Chalek, wanting to continue to orchestrate and plan activist fashion shows to raise awareness and empower other marginalized groups. In February 2016, New York Fashion Week came to a close with another activist fashion show this time using the fashion platform to shed light on the visually impaired community with the first-ever fashion show consisting of all blind models. Although Chalek encountered some controversy as one of the criteria for models to apply was to walk without their guide dogs or canes, the visually impaired community was positively receptive to the show.

After the success with New York's Fashion week, Chalek hosted a second blind fashion Show at the Pavillon Vendome as part of Paris's 2016 Fashion Week. The Show featured blind and visually impaired models Among them was 2012 Mrs. America and Mrs. World pageant winner, April Lufriu who walked the runway with her daughter Savannah both who currently live with Retinitis Pigmentosa.

#MeToo Movement 
Chalek has also attempted to raise awareness on sexual abuse. During the second night of New York 2018, she used the #MeToo slogan to show the world that sexual violence is also widespread and pervasive in the fashion and modeling industry. Her goal was to show other survivors that they are not alone. On February 9, 2018 the #MeToo Fashion Show took place at The Green Room 42, in Manhattan. Chalek used her American Wardrobe label as a platform to benefit women. Eight models each survivors of rape, sexual harassment, child sexual abuse, groping and incest walked the runway wearing garments that represented their abuse. Each of the survivors walked accompanied by a male model wearing a pig mask which was an oblique reference to the #MeToo movement in France translated as #exposeyourpig. The male models were handcuffed to a chair as victims shared with the audience their experience as a victim of assault or/and sexual misconduct in “vivid and disturbing detail”. Among the survivors participating in this fashion show was Alicia Kozakiewiecz, a young woman who was abducted in 2002 near her Pittsburgh home.

References 

Living people
American women in business
Year of birth missing (living people)
21st-century American women